Alin Moldoveanu (born 3 May 1983, in Focșani) is a Romanian 10 m Air Rifle sport shooter, Olympic champion at the 2012 Summer Olympics. He also competed in the 2008 Summer Olympics where he ranked fourth.

Moldoveanu won the gold medal in the 10 m Air Rifle in the London Olympics 2012 with a total score of 702.1. In the qualifying round, he scored 599 points, managing to equal the Olympic record set by China’s Zhu Qinan in Athens in 2004.

References

External links

ISSF Portrait

Sportspeople from Focșani
1983 births
Living people
Romanian male sport shooters
ISSF rifle shooters
Olympic shooters of Romania
Olympic gold medalists for Romania
Olympic medalists in shooting
Shooters at the 2008 Summer Olympics
Shooters at the 2012 Summer Olympics
Shooters at the 2016 Summer Olympics
Medalists at the 2012 Summer Olympics
European Games competitors for Romania
Shooters at the 2015 European Games
Shooters at the 2019 European Games